Fairyland (Faerie, Scottish Elfame, c.f. Old Norse Álfheimr) in English and Scottish folklore is the fabulous land or abode of fairies or fays. Old French  (Early Modern English ) referred to an illusion or enchantment, the land of the faes. Modern English (by the 17th century) fairy transferred the name of the realm of the fays to its inhabitants, e.g. the expression fairie knight in Edmund Spenser's The Faerie Queene refers to a "supernatural knight" or a "knight of Faerie" but was later re-interpreted as referring to a knight who is "a fairy".

Folklore
Fairyland may be referred to simply as Fairy or Faerie, though that usage is an archaism. It is often the land ruled by the "Queen of Fairy" and thus anything from fairyland is also sometimes described as being from the "Court of the Queen of " or from the Seelie court in Scottish folklore.

In English and Scots texts

Records of the Scottish witch trials reveal that many initiates claimed to have had congress with the "Queen of Elfame" and her retinue. On November 8, 1576, midwife Bessie Dunlop, a resident of Dalry, Scotland, was accused of sorcery and witchcraft. She answered her accusers that she had received tuition from Thomas Reid, a former barony officer who had died at the Battle of Pinkie 30 years earlier, and from the Queen of "Court of Elfame" that lay nearby. It resulted in a conviction and she was burned at the stake in 1576.

Allison Peirson was burned as a witch in 1588 for conversing with the Queen of Elfame and for prescribing magic charms and potions (Byre Hills, Fife, Scotland). This same woman (styled "Alison Pearson") is also featured in Robert Sempill's ballad (1583) where she is said to have been in a fairy-ride. Sempill's piece mentions "Elphyne" glossed as "Elfland" or "Fairyland".

In the medieval verse romance and the Scottish ballad of Thomas the Rhymer, the title character is spirited away by a female supernatural being. Although identified by commentators as the Queen of Fairies, the texts refrain from specifically naming her or her domain except in ballad version A, in which she is referred to as the Queen of Elfland. Poet and novelist Robert Graves published his own alteration of the ballad, replacing her name with "Queen of Elphame":

Elfhame or Elfland is portrayed in a variety of ways in these ballads and stories, most commonly as mystical and benevolent, but also at times as sinister and wicked. The mysteriousness of the land and its otherworldly powers are a source of skepticism and distrust in many tales. Additional journeys to the realm include the fairy tale "Childe Rowland", which presents a particularly negative view of the land.

See also
 Otherworld
 Seelie
 Tír na nÓg

References

Bibliography

English folklore
Fairies
Mythological kingdoms, empires, and countries
Scottish folklore